Periclimenes batei is a species of shrimp found in the Pacific and Indian Oceans. It was first named by L. A. Borradaile in 1888, in commemoration of Charles Spence Bate who wrote the section on shrimp in the reports of the Challenger expedition.

References

Palaemonidae
Crustaceans described in 1888